Treaty of Münster refers to two treaties signed in 1648, and forming part of the Peace of Westphalia ending the Thirty Years' War:

 Peace of Münster of January 1648 (ratified in May of that year) ending the war between the Dutch Republic and Spain
 Treaty of Münster of October 1648, which ended the war between France and the Holy Roman Empire